Sardar Abdur Rashid is a Jatiya Party (Ershad) politician and the former Member of Parliament of Patuakhali-1.

Career
Rashid fought in Bangladesh Liberation war. His sisters, SM Monwara Monu and SM Anwara Anu, also fought in the war. He was elected to parliament from Patuakhali-1 as a Jatiya Party candidate in 1986.

References

Jatiya Party politicians
Living people
3rd Jatiya Sangsad members
4th Jatiya Sangsad members
Mukti Bahini personnel
Year of birth missing (living people)